Municipal elections were held in Estonia on 15 October 2017, coinciding with an administrative reform which reduced the total number of municipalities from 213 to 79. The advance voting was held 5–11 October, during which 27.8% of voters cast their vote. During the advance voting, more people voted digitally than in any previous elections.

Results

By municipality

References

External links
Estonian National Electoral Committee

2017 elections in Europe
2017 in Estonia
2017